Mike Basopu is a South African politician. He was a Member of Parliament from the African National Congress from 24 November 2021 until his resignation on 27 February 2023 to make way for Finance Minister Enoch Godongwana to be sworn in.

See also
Politics of South Africa

References 

Living people
Year of birth missing (living people)
African National Congress politicians
21st-century South African politicians
Members of the National Assembly of South Africa